Sorgraw Petchyindee Academy is a Muay Thai fighter. He is the current 160 lb and former 147 lb Lumpinee Stadium champion and two time Toyota Marathon tournament winner.

Muay Thai career
He won both the Lumpini Stadium and Thailand 147 lb title in December 2015, with a decision win over Manaowan Sitsongpeenong. In his next fight, he fought a rematch with Manaowan, and once again won by decision. He then entered the 2016 Toyota Marathon 154 lb tournament. Winning decisions against Francisco Salen in the quarterfinal, Phakhow Darbphong 191 in the semifinal and Rafael Fiziev in the final. After winning two more fights against Carlos Alberto and Mohamed Souane with Top King World Series, he entered the organizations 2016 tournament, and suffered his first loss of 2016, losing a decision to Yodwicha Por Boonsit.

Sorgraw entered the 2017 Toyota Marathon 154 lb tournament as well, facing Chamuaktong in the semifinal. He won the fight by decision, and took the tournament title by winning a decision against Rafael Fiziev. In March 2017, Sorgraw fought Jordan Watson for the Yokkao 70kg title. Watson successfully defended the title by unanimous decision.

In September 2019, Sorgraw challenged the reigning Lumpini Stadium champion Jimmy Vienot for his 160 lb title. He won the fight by decision.

He was scheduled to fight Luis Cajaiba at Road to ONE 6: WSS. However on December 21, the event was cancelled due to the COVID-19 pandemic. The fight was later rescheduled for February 28, 2021.

Titles and accomplishments
Professional Boxing Association of Thailand (PAT) 
 2015 Thailand -147 lb Champion

Lumpinee Stadium
 2015 Lumpinee Stadium -147 lb Champion
 2019 Lumpinee Stadium -160 lb Champion

Toyota Marathon
 2016 Toyota Marathon -154 lb Champion
 2017 Toyota Marathon -154 lb Champion

World Muaythai Council
 2017 WMC World -160 lb Champion

True4U Muaymanwansuk
 2019 True4u Middleweight Champion

Fight record

|-  style="background:#fbb;"
| 2022-03-12||Loss||align=left| Nayanesh Ayman || War Of Titans II || Madrid, Spain ||Decision || 3 || 3:00 
|-  style="background:#fbb;"
| 2021-02-28|| Loss ||align=left| Luis Cajaiba || WSS Fights, World Siam Stadium || Bangkok, Thailand || Decision|| 5 || 3:00
|-  style="background:#fbb;"
| 2020-11-13||Loss||align=left| Thananchai Sitsongpeenong || True4U Muaymanwansuk, Rangsit Stadium || Pathum Thani, Thailand || Decision ||5 || 3:00
|-  style="background:#cfc;"
| 2020-07-31 || Win||align=left| Pongsiri P.K.Saenchaimuaythaigym ||  ONE Championship: No Surrender 2  || Bangkok, Thailand || Decision (Split)|| 3 ||  3:00
|- style="background:#fbb;"
| 2019-11-29 || Loss||align=left| Yodkhunpon Sitmonchai || Lumpinee Stadium || Bangkok, Thailand || Decision  || 5 || 3:00
|-  style="background:#cfc;"
| 2019-09-25 || Win||align=left| Jimmy Vienot ||  Lumpinee Stadium  || Bangkok, Thailand || Decision  || 5 ||  3:00
|-
! style=background:white colspan=9 |
|-  style="background:#cfc;"
| 2019-08-23 || Win||align=left| Mostafa Naghibi ||  Muay Thai Marathon Toyota Hilux Revo || Saraburi, Thailand || KO ||  ||
|-
! style=background:white colspan=9 |
|-  style="background:#cfc;"
| 2019-07-12 || Win||align=left| George Mann ||  ONE Championship: Masters Of Destiny  || Kuala Lumpur, Malaysia || Decision (Split)|| 3 ||  3:00
|- style="background:#cfc;"
| 2018-12-29 || Win||align=left| Mohamed Houmer || 14 Year Anniversary Phetchbuncha || Ko Samui, Thailand || TKO (Corner Stoppage) || 2 || 3:00
|- style="background:#fbb;"
| 2018-11-09 || Loss||align=left| Giorgio Petrosyan || ONE Championship 81: Heart of the Lion || Kallang, Singapore || Decision (Unanimous) || 3 || 3:00
|-  style="background:#fbb;"
| 2018-08-23 || Loss||align=left| Jimmy Vienot || Best Of Siam XIII Rajadamnern Stadium  || Bangkok, Thailand || Decision (Split) || 5 ||  3:00
|-
! style=background:white colspan=9 |
|-  style="background:#cfc;"
| 2018-06-29 || Win ||align=left| Samy Sana || ONE Championship: Spirit of a Warrior || Yangon, Myanmar || Decision (Unanimous) || 3 || 3:00
|-  style="background:#fbb;"
| 2018-04-28 || Loss ||align=left| Talaytong Sor.Thanaphet ||Top King World Series 19, Final || Mahasarakham, Thailand || Decision || 3 || 3:00
|-  style="background:#cfc;"
| 2018-04-28 || Win ||align=left| Nattakiat Phran26 ||Top King World Series 19, Semi Final || Mahasarakham, Thailand || Decision || 3 || 3:00
|-  style="background:#cfc;"
| 2018-01-26 || Win ||align=left| Yodpayak Sitsongpeenong || True4U Muaymanwansuk Rangsit Stadium || Pathum Thani, Thailand || Decision || 5 || 3:00
|-  style="background:#cfc;"
| 2017-12-06 || Win ||align=left| Manaowan Sitsongpeenong || || Thailand || Decision || 5 || 3:00
|-  style="background:#cfc;"
| 2017- || Win ||align=left|  ||   || Thailand || Decision|| 5 || 3:00 
|-
! style=background:white colspan=9 |
|-  style="background:#fbb;"
| 2017-09-01 || Loss||align=left| Dechrid Sathian Muaythai Gym || Rangsit Boxing Stadium || Pathum Thani, Thailand || Decision || 5 || 3:00
|-  style="background:#cfc;"
| 2017-06-30 || Win ||align=left| Mansur Tolipov ||   || Thailand || Decision|| 5 || 3:00 
|-
! style=background:white colspan=9 |
|-  style="background:#cfc;"
| 2017-04-28 || Win ||align=left| Khalid Oman ||   || Udon Thani, Thailand || TKO ||  ||  
|-
! style=background:white colspan=9 |
|-  style="background:#fbb;"
| 2017-03-25 || Loss||align=left| Jordan Watson || Yokkao 23 || Bolton, England || Decision (unanimous) || 5 || 3:00
|-
! style=background:white colspan=9 |
|-  style="background:#cfc;"
| 2017-02-24 || Win ||align=left| Dechrid Sathian Muaythai Gym || Rangsit Boxing Stadium || Pathum Thani, Thailand || Decision || 5 || 3:00
|-  style="background:#cfc;"
| 2017-01-27 || Win ||align=left| Rafael Fiziev || Toyota Marathon, Final || Phitsanulok, Thailand || Decision || 3 || 3:00
|-
! style=background:white colspan=9 |
|-  style="background:#cfc;"
| 2017-01-27 || Win ||align=left| Chamuaktong || Toyota Marathon, Semi Final || Phitsanulok, Thailand || Decision || 3 || 3:00
|-  style="background:#fbb;"
| 2016-11-27 || Loss ||align=left| Yodwicha Por Boonsit || Top King World Series 11, Quarter Final|| Nanchang, China || Decision (Unanimous) || 3 || 3:00
|-  style="background:#cfc;"
| 2016-08-27 || Win ||align=left| Mohamed Souane || Top King World Series || Chengdu, China || TKO || 1 ||
|-  style="background:#cfc;"
| 2016-07-10 || Win ||align=left| Carlos Alberto || Top King World Series || Luoyang, China || Decision || 3 || 3:00
|-  style="background:#cfc;"
| 2016-04-29 || Win ||align=left| Rafael Fiziev || Toyota Marathon, Final || Chonburi, Thailand || Decision || 3 || 3:00
|-
! style=background:white colspan=9 |
|-  style="background:#cfc;"
| 2016-04-29 || Win ||align=left| Phakhow Darbphong 191|| Toyota Marathon, Semi Final || Chonburi, Thailand || Decision || 3 || 3:00
|-  style="background:#cfc;"
| 2016-04-29 || Win ||align=left| Francisco Salen|| Toyota Marathon, Quarter Final || Chonburi, Thailand || Decision || 3 || 3:00
|-  style="background:#cfc;"
| 2016-01-30 || Win ||align=left| Manaowan Sitsongpeenong || Rajadamnern Stadium || Thailand || Decision || 5 || 3:00
|- style="background:#cfc;"
| 2015-12-08 || Win ||align=left| Manaowan Sitsongpeenong || Lumpinee Stadium || Thailand || Decision || 5 || 3:00
|-
! style=background:white colspan=9 |
|- style="background:#cfc;"
| 2015-09-27 || Win ||align=left| Petchmanee Dabrunsarakam || Rangsit Boxing Stadium || Pathum Thani, Thailand || Decision || 5 || 3:00
|-  style="background:#cfc;"
| 2015-09-19 || Win||align=left| Auisiewpor Sujibamikiew || Omnoi Boxing Stadium || Thailand || KO || 3 ||
|-  style="background:#fbb;"
| 2015-08-22 || Loss||align=left| Por.Tor.Thor. Petchrungruang || Omnoi Stadium || Samut Sakhon || Decision || 5 || 3:00
|- style="background:#cfc;"
| 2015-07-12 || Win ||align=left| Saensak Phetbancha || Rangsit Boxing Stadium || Pathum Thani, Thailand || Decision || 5 || 3:00
|-  style="background:#fbb;"
| 2015-04-11 || Loss ||align=left| Christian Baya|| Choc des Mondes || France || KO || 4 ||
|- style="background:#cfc;"
| 2015-03-15 || Win ||align=left| Fady Bou Abboud || Gala International Muaythai || Reims, France || Decision || 5 || 3:00
|-  style="background:#fbb;"
| 2014-10-28 || Loss||align=left| Sitthichai Sitsongpeenong || Petyindee Fights, Lumpinee Stadium || Bangkok, Thailand || TKO (Ref Stoppage/High Kick) || 4 || 
|-
! style=background:white colspan=9 |
|- style="background:#cfc;"
| 2014-09-27 || Win ||align=left| Phetthaksin Por.Samranchai || Lumpinee Stadium || Bangkok, Thailand || Decision || 5 || 3:00
|-
| colspan=9 | Legend:

See also
 List of male kickboxers

References

1994 births
Sorgraw Petchyindee Academy
Living people
Sorgraw Petchyindee Academy
ONE Championship kickboxers